Monodora is a genus of plant in family Annonaceae. It contains approximately 15 species, distributed throughout tropical Africa.

Selected species

 Monodora angolensis Welw.
 Monodora carolinae Couvreur
 Monodora crispata Engl.
 Monodora globiflora Couvreur
 Monodora grandidieri Baill.
 Monodora hastipetala Couvreur
 Monodora junodii Engl. & Diels
 Monodora laurentii De Wild.
 Monodora minor Engl. & Diels
 Monodora myristica (Gaertn.) Dunal; Calabash nutmeg; based on: Annona myristica Gaertn.
 Monodora stenopetala Oliv.
 Monodora tenuifolia Benth.
 Monodora undulata (P.Beauv.) Couvreur
 Monodora unwinii Hutch. & Dalz.
 Monodora zenkeri Engl.

External links
 IPNI List of Species.

References

 
Annonaceae genera
Taxonomy articles created by Polbot